Tamara Korpatsch was the defending champion, but lost in the semifinals to Laura Siegemund.

Ekaterine Gorgodze won the title, defeating Siegemund in the final 6–2, 6–1.

Seeds

Draw

Finals

Top half

Bottom half

References
Main Draw

Ladies Open Hechingen - Singles